Assault is a crime and a tort involving physically harming, or threatening to harm, another person.

Assault may also refer to:

Law
Assault (tort), in common law, an intentional act causing the reasonable apprehension of harmful contact
Common assault, an offence in English law similar to the above
Psychic assault, a term sometimes used as a synonym for assault to distinguish from the crime of battery

Arts and entertainment

Films
Assault (film), a 1971 British crime thriller
The Assault (1936 film), a French political thriller
The Assault (1986 film), a Dutch film set in WWII, based on the 1982 Mulisch novel
The Assault (1996 film), an American action movie
The Assault (2010 film), a French action thriller
The Assault (2017 film), an American crime action movie

Video games
Assault (1983 video game), a fixed shooter game for the Atari 2600
Assault (1988 video game), a multi-directional shooter arcade game
Assault: Retribution, a 1998 video game for the PlayStation console
Star Fox: Assault, a 2005 video game for the Gamecube console

Other media
The Assault, a 1982 Dutch novel by Harry Mulisch
Assault Championship Wrestling, Connecticut, U.S.
"Assault", a 1994 song by Daft Punk

Other uses
Assault (horse) (1943–1971), a Texas-bred American racehorse
Assault, a military tactic

See also